Zarnia Cogle (born 10 May 1976 in Christchurch, New Zealand) is an association football player who represented New Zealand at international level.

Cogle made her Football Ferns debut in a 1–2 loss to Canada on 31 May 2000, and finished her international career with 18 caps to her credit.

References

External links

1976 births
Living people
New Zealand women's association footballers
New Zealand women's international footballers
Association footballers from Christchurch

Women's association footballers not categorized by position